Cutlers Ait is an island in the River Thames in England adjacent to Romney Island and Romney Lock, near Windsor, Berkshire.

The island is a tree-covered strip adjacent to the opposite bank of the river from the Lock, near Eton. Romney weir sits between the two islands.

See also
Islands in the River Thames

Islands of Berkshire
Islands of the River Thames